Enrique Campino (1794–1874) was a Chilean politician and soldier who campaigned for his country's independence.

Early life
Campino was born in La Serena, Santiago in 1794 and died on October 26, 1874. He was a Chilean military officer who participated in the process that led to the independence of that country in the early nineteenth century . His parents were Captain Don Andres Fernandez de Campino y Erazo and Magdalena Salamanca y Messía. In 1821, he married Dona Ignacia Landa de los Rios.

Military career
He joined the Army in 1810 as a lieutenant of the Grenadier Regiment of Infantry. He helped quell the mutiny of Colonel Thomas Figueroa on 1 April 1811 (the Figueroa Mutiny). He participated in the campaigns of the south until 1812. After the Disaster of Rancagua in 1814, he emigrated to Mendoza, Argentina, joining the Army of the Andes. He fought in the Battle of Chacabuco in 1817.

In 1820, he participated in the Liberating Expedition of Peru with the rank of colonel and in the Chiloe campaign (1825–1826).
In January 1827, along with his brother Joaquin, he took part in the so-called Campino Uprising.
On 15 February 1832, he reached the rank of general.

Political career
He was elected an MP for Santiago in 1826, 1828, 1829, 1831–1834, and 1858–1861.
As an MP, Campino signed the 1828 Constitution. He was later mayor of the Santiago Province and a senator from 1861 to 1870.

1794 births
1874 deaths
People from La Serena
Chilean people of Spanish descent
Deputies of the I Legislative Period of the National Congress of Chile
Deputies of the III Legislative Period of the National Congress of Chile
Deputies of the XII Legislative Period of the National Congress of Chile
Senators of the XIII Legislative Period of the National Congress of Chile
Senators of the XIV Legislative Period of the National Congress of Chile
Senators of the XV Legislative Period of the National Congress of Chile
Senators of the XVI Legislative Period of the National Congress of Chile
Chilean Army officers